Egusi soup is a soup prepared with egusi seeds as a primary ingredient. Egusi seeds are the fat- and protein-rich seeds of certain cucurbitaceous  (squash, melon, gourd) plants. Egusi soup is common and prevalent across Central Africa, and may be served atop rice, cooked vegetables, or grilled meat, such as goat, chicken, beef, or fish. It may also be served atop fufu, omelettes, amala, and eba, among other foods.  Egusi soup is also consumed in West Africa, sometimes with chicken.

Preparation
It is prepared by grinding egusi seeds, from which a paste is created. There are two methods of preparing Egusi Soup: 

1. Frying method: In this method, fry the ground melon paste (egusi paste) in palm oil before adding other ingredients.

2. Boiling method: When using this method, you can add small lumps of the egusi paste to boiling water and break them using the back of a ladle after cooking for 10 minutes.

Soup ingredients may include tomato, onion, chili pepper, and cooking oil, such as palm oil. Sometimes pumpkin seeds are substituted in place of egusi seeds.

Similar dishes

Egusi soup is a kind of soup thickened with the ground seeds and popular in West Africa, with considerable local variation.  Besides the seeds, water, and oil, egusi soup typically contains leaf vegetables and other vegetables, seasonings, and meat.

See also

 List of soups

References

African soups